E9 or E-9 may refer to:

Roads and trails
 European route E09
 European walking route E9
 E9, the Besraya Expressway in Malaysia
 Kyoto Jūkan Expressway, San'in Kinki Expressway and San'in Expressway, route E9 in Japan

Vehicles
 BMW E9, a two-door coupé built for BMW by Karmann from 1968 to 1975
 EMD E9, a diesel locomotive
 E-9A Widget, U.S. Air Force range control aircraft

Other uses
 E9 (countries) a forum of nine highly populated countries
 E9 (Lie algebra) (E9), another name for the infinite dimensional affine Lie algebra
 E9 tuning, a common tuning for steel guitar necks of more than six strings
 E9, a baseball scorekeeping abbreviation for an error on the right fielder
 E9, a postcode district in the E postcode area of the London postal district
 Boston-Maine Airways IATA code
 E-9, a U.S. uniformed services pay grade